Shaun Stephen van Rooyen (born 27 April 1987) is a New Zealand football (soccer) who plays for New Zealand Football Championship side Waikato FC and has represented New Zealand at the Olympic Games.

Van Rooyen was included in the New Zealand squad for the football tournament at the Summer Olympics in Beijing where he played in two of New Zealand's group matches, against China (1-1) and Brazil (0-5).

References

External links

1987 births
Living people
New Zealand association footballers
Olympic association footballers of New Zealand
Australian people of New Zealand descent
Footballers at the 2008 Summer Olympics
Association football midfielders
Soccer players from Sydney